The electric flash-lamp uses electric current to start flash powder burning, to provide a brief sudden burst of bright light. It was principally used for flash photography in the early 20th century but had other uses as well. Previously, photographers' flash powder, introduced in 1887 by Adolf Miethe and Johannes Gaedicke, had to be ignited manually, exposing the user to greater risk.

Invention 

The electric flash-lamp was invented by Joshua Cohen (a.k.a. Joshua Lionel Cohen of the Lionel toy train fame) in 1899, and by Paul Boyer in France.  It was granted U.S. patent number 636,492.  This flash of bright light from the flash-lamp was used for indoor photography in the late nineteenth century and the early part of the twentieth century.

Joshua Lionel Cohen's flash-lamp patent 636,492 reads in part, 

The principle of operation of the electrical flash-lamp is linked to the shutter of an early box camera: tripping the shutter ignites the flash powder and releases the potential energy of the exploding powder causing a bright flash for indoor photography.

Uses of flash-lamp 
The main purpose of Cohen's invention was as a fuse to ignite explosive powder to get a photographer's flash. One of the first practical applications, however, for Cohen's flash-lamp was as underwater mine detonator fuses for the U.S. Navy. In 1899, the year the invention was patented, the government awarded Cohen a $12,000 contract for 24,000 naval mine detonator fuses. The use of the flash for photography was dangerous, and photographers could get burned hands from the flash.

Electric apparatus applications 

A 1910 brochure for the Nesbit High Speed Flashlight Apparatus says,

See also 
 Valentin Wolfenstein
 Flash (photography)
 Flashlight

Footnotes

Bibliography 
Beyer, Rick, The Greatest Stories Never Told - 100 Tales from History to Astonish, Bewilder & Stupefy, The History Channel, 2000, 

Photographic lighting
1899 introductions
Obsolete technologies